Ballycroy GAA is a Gaelic Athletic Association club located in Ballycroy, in northern County Mayo, Ireland. The club is focused exclusively on Gaelic football and was founded in 1889. In the 1960s, Ballycroy played alongside Kiltane GAA in the club St Pat's. As of 2023, Ballycroy and Kiltane were also combining to field under-age teams. 

The club won its first trophy, the Erris Cup, in 1956. Ballycroy's first appearance in a men's county final was a division 5 league final in 2019, on the 130th anniversary of the club, when they beat Louisbourg after extra time.

Further reading
  (NLI call number 10A 2915)

References

Gaelic football clubs in County Mayo
Gaelic games clubs in County Mayo